Botts is a surname of European origin. The name refers to:
Baker Botts International law firm named for James Addison Baker and Confederate Colonel Walter Browne Botts
Chantal Botts (b. 1976), South African Olympic badminton player
Elbert Dysart Botts (1893–1962), American highway engineer
Jason Botts (b. 1980), American professional baseball player
John Botts (1802–1869), American politician from Virginia; U.S. representative 1839–49
Lee Botts (1928-2019), American environmentalist and conservationist
Mike Botts (1944–2005), American rock drummer
Timothy Botts (contemporary), American calligrapher and illustrator

See also

 Bott
 Gasterophilus intestinalis or horse botfly: infestation of a horse's stomach by maggots of this insect is known as "the botts"

Surnames of European origin